This is a list of the Tunisia national football team results from 1920s to the present day that, for various reasons, are not accorded the status of official internationals.

Results

1920s

1930s

1940s

1950s

1960s

1970s

1980s

1990s

2000s

2010s

2020s

Notes 
 * Match of two Half-times of 30 minutes  each.
 ** Match of three Half-times of 35 minutes  each.
 *** Number of substitutions exceeds the limit of FIFA rules.

References 

Tunisia national football team results